WWE Hall of Fame (2008) was the event which featured the introduction of the 9th class to the WWE Hall of Fame. The event was produced by World Wrestling Entertainment (WWE) on March 29, 2008 from the Amway Arena in Orlando, Florida. The event took place the same weekend as WrestleMania XXIV. The event was hosted by Gene Okerlund and Todd Grisham. The ceremony aired live on the WWE's website, with the final hour airing live on the USA Network. In March 2015 the ceremony was added to the WWE Network.

Inductees

Individual
 Class headliners appear in boldface

Group

References

WWE Hall of Fame ceremonies
2008 in professional wrestling
2008 in professional wrestling in Florida
Professional wrestling shows in Orlando, Florida
March 2008 events in the United States